λ Hydrae, Latinised as Lambda Hydrae, is a spectroscopic binary star in the constellation Hydra. Its apparent magnitude is 3.61 Located around  distant.

The primary is an orange giant of spectral type K0IIICN+1, a star that has used up its core hydrogen, left the main sequence, and expanded into a giant.  It is considered to be a red clump giant, a cool horizontal branch star that is burning helium in its core.

References

K-type giants
Horizontal-branch stars
Spectroscopic binaries
Hydra (constellation)
Hydrae, Lambda
Durchmusterung objects
Hydrae, 41
088284
049841
3994